Damages are the money paid or awarded to a claimant in a civil action.

Damages may also refer to:
Damages (TV series), a legal drama
Damages (Jewish law), a range of jurisprudential topics that roughly correspond in secular law to torts
"Damages" (song), 2021 single by Tems
 or Damages, the fourth Order of the Mishna

See also
Damage (disambiguation)
Consequential damages, one kind of damages that may be awarded to plaintiff in a civil action
Expectation damages, a form of damages available as a recourse to a breached contract
Liquidated damages, damages which are liquidated/assessed and fixed at the date of the contract
Punitive damages, damages awarded to mark the court's disapproval of a particular conduct
Speculative damages, claims made by a plaintiff for losses that may occur in the future
Statutory damages, damages recoverable pursuant to statute
Treble damages